Jazzen is a studio album by Swedish musicians Nina Ramsby and Martin Hederos, released 16 October 2006 on Amigo Musik. It is the second collaboration by the duo (Visorna was released in 2004). The album consists of English-language jazz standards, translated into Swedish by Ramsby, as well as new compositions by Hederos and Ramsby. Tracks include Swedish versions of "I Got It Bad (and That Ain't Good)" by Duke Ellington, "Open the Door" by Betty Carter and "Lover Man" by Jimmy Davis, Roger Ramirez and Jimmy Sherman.

The album reached No. 36 on the Swedish Sverigetopplistan albums chart.

Track listing

References

2006 albums
Jazz albums by Swedish artists